Front Row Channel is a global digital live music channel owned by Jungo TV, based in the United States. The channel specializes in broadcasts of live concerts with featured performances from the world's top musical acts.

International distribution
In addition to the United States, the channel is also available through distribution in India (via IMCL), Indonesia (via OONA TV), and the Philippines (via Solar Entertainment Corporation).

References

Television channels and stations established in 2018
Television networks in the United States